The 1990 Philippine Basketball Association (PBA) rookie draft was an event at which teams drafted players from the amateur ranks. The annual rookie draft was held on January 10, 1990, at the ULTRA.

Round 1

Round 2

Round 3

Round 4

Notes
 Purefoods acquired Alaska's first round pick in a trade involving Abet Guidaben.
 Purefoods traded rookie picks Villarias and Mejos to Pepsi for first and second picks in the 1991 draft.
 Purefoods' other pick, Louie Alas, never played in the PBA due to a career-ending ACL injury. However, he became an assistant coach of Purefoods in 1997.

References

Philippine Basketball Association draft
draft
PBA draft